Arvind Singh Bhadoria is an Indian politician and leader of the Bharatiya Janata Party. He has served as the Minister of Cooperative and Public Service Management in the Government of Madhya Pradesh, since 2 July 2020. He was elected as Member of the Madhya Pradesh Legislative Assembly for the a second term to Ater constituency of Bhind district.

Personal life 
Arvind Singh Bhadoria was born on 2 October 1969 in the Gyanpura village of the Bhind district of Madhya Pradesh state to Kamala Devi and Shivnath Singh Bhadoria, the third child. Arvind Singh Bhadoria's mother was a religious housewife and his father served in the police department. At a young age, he joined the Shakha of the RSS, and continued this association for a long time. He also joined the student organization Akhil Bharatiya Vidyarthi Parishad. In 2007, he married Archana Bhadoria.

Early life and political career 

Arvind Singh Bhadoria started student politics when he joined Akhil Bharatiya Vidyarthi Parishad in 1984. In 1986, he became the Nagar Mantri of Akhil Bharatiya Vidyarthi Parishad, Bhind Nagar. After this, in 1987, he became the convener of Bhind district, and then contested the election of the student union from the MJS College of the Bhind district. In 1989, he became the Vibhag convener. He became full-time ABVP in 1990. From 1990 to 1994, two divisions were the organization secretary of Bhopal and Gwalior joint divisions respectively. In 1994 he became the provincial secretary of Madhya Bharat province. From 1995 to 2003, he was the provincial organization minister of the Madhya Bharat province. After this, he was given the responsibility as the organization Secretary of Yuva Morcha until 2003-04. He was given charge of the 2003 assembly election management team. In 2004, he was made the National Vice President of Bharatiya Janata Yuva Morcha, and in 2005 he was made the state secretary of Madhya Pradesh BJP, which he remained continuously (5 times) till 2011. From 2011 to 2014, he became the National Vice President and National General Secretary of the Bharatiya Janata Party Kisan Morcha respectively. From 2014 to 2016, he was the State General Secretary of the Bharatiya Janata Party, Madhya Pradesh. In 2015, he was elected State Managing Committee member of the Indian Red Cross Society, later becoming the State Vice President of Bharatiya Janata Party of Madhya Pradesh from 2016 to 2019. In 2018 he also became the State Vice President of the Indian Red Cross Society in Madhya Pradesh.

As a representative 
Arvind Singh Bhadoria became an MLA for the first time in 2008 from the Ater Assembly constituency by defeating Congress leader, former minister and former Leader of Opposition Satyadev Katare. In 2018, he was again elected as MLA for the second time from the Ater assembly of the state of Madhya Pradesh. The role of Arvind Singh Bhadoria was very important during Operation Lotus- 2020. He became the Minister of Cooperative and Public Service Management after the re-formation of the Shivraj government in 2020.

References 

Living people
1969 births
People from Bhind district 
Bharatiya Janata Party politicians from Madhya Pradesh 
Madhya Pradesh MLAs 2018–2023
State cabinet ministers of Madhya Pradesh